Suzanne Kiffer-Porte (21 March 1901 – 14 January 1985) was a French swimmer. She competed in the women's 200 metre breaststroke event at the 1924 Summer Olympics.

References

External links
 

1901 births
1985 deaths
Olympic swimmers of France
Swimmers at the 1924 Summer Olympics
Swimmers from Paris
French female breaststroke swimmers
20th-century French women